Macau is the official name in Portuguese language of the Macao Special Administrative Region of the People's Republic of China, as it is officially called in English language. 

Macau or Macao may also refer to:

Places
Mação Municipality, in Portugal
Macau (microregion), in Brazil
Macau, Brazil, a port city
Macau, Gironde, a commune in France
Macău, a village in Aghireșu commune, Romania
Macău, the Romanian name for Makó in Hungary
Portuguese Macau, an historical colony of Portugal which is now the Macao special administrative region

Arts, entertainment, and media
 Macau (card game)
 Macao (card game)
 Macao (dice game)
 Macao (film), a 1952 film
 Macao (novel), a spy novel

Other uses
 Macau Esporte Clube, a Brazilian football club
 Scarlet macaw (Ara macao), a parrot

See also
 Macaw (disambiguation)
 Macou (disambiguation)